Edward Makary Maniura (born 24 February 1960 in Lubsza) is a Polish politician. He was elected to the Sejm on 25 September 2005, getting 11,279 votes in 28 Częstochowa district as a candidate from the Civic Platform list.

He was also a member of Sejm 1997-2001 and Sejm 2001-2005.

See also
Members of Polish Sejm 2005-2007

External links
Edward Maniura - parliamentary page - includes declarations of interest, voting record, and transcripts of speeches.

Members of the Polish Sejm 2005–2007
Members of the Polish Sejm 1997–2001
Members of the Polish Sejm 2001–2005
Civic Platform politicians
1960 births
Living people
Mayors of places in Poland
Recipients of the Order of Polonia Restituta
People from Lubliniec County